Krempermarsch or Kremper Marsch is an Amt ("collective municipality") in the county of Steinburg, in Schleswig-Holstein, Germany. It is situated between Itzehoe and Glückstadt. The seat of the Amt is in the town Krempe.

The Amt Krempermarsch consists of the following municipalities (population in 2005 between brackets):

Bahrenfleth (606)
Dägeling (1,016)
Elskop (157)
Grevenkop  /348)
Krempe (2,447)
Kremperheide (2,547)
Krempermoor (530)
Neuenbrook (688)
Rethwisch (618)
Süderau (792)

References

Ämter in Schleswig-Holstein